American Pool Checkers, also called "American Pool", is a variant of draughts, mainly played in the mid-Atlantic and southeastern United States and in Puerto Rico.

Basic rules

As in the related game English draughts (also known as American checkers or straight checkers), the game is played on an 8x8 board with the double corner (corner without a checker) to each player's right.  The opponent playing the dark pieces will start the game by making the first move. One difference from the rules of English checkers is that a piece may capture both forward and backward. A player must capture an opponent's checker when possible (both forward and backward), but if two possibilities exist, the player may choose the sequence (even if one sequence has more jumps). The pieces are not removed until all jumps are completed and the player's hand is removed from his piece. A player may not capture an opponent more than one time. A player may not capture his own pieces.
Another difference is that kings are flying kings. A king can jump any number of squares forward and backward. A king can make right turns after a jump and continue along another path after successfully taking an opponent. A king must also make all the possible jumps during a sequence.
If the condition arises that one player has three kings and the other has just one king, the player who has the three kings must win within thirteen moves (even if the fourteenth move is a capture).

Past champions of the American Pool Checker Association
Names of champions in the several divisions are listed with the APCA club that they represent.

All Tournament Results 2005–2019

References

External links
 American Pool Checker Association (APCA)
 The World of Pool Checkers (including library)

Draughts variants